Eligijus Jankauskas (born 22 June 1998) is a Lithuanian professional footballer who currently plays for as a winger for FA Šiauliai.

Club career

Lithuanian clubs 
Eligijus Jankauskas started his career in his local club, FK Šiauliai. At the time he played for highest tier league in Lithuania. His career at Šiauliai took two seasons. Jankauskas played sixteen matches for this club.

In the 2016 season, Jankauskas joined FK Utenis Utena. In the middle of the season, he moved to FK Sūduva Marijampolė helping them gain third place at the table.

At the end of the 2016 season Jankauskas was named the most prospective player in Lithuania. At the same ceremony, Fedor Černych was named the best Lithuanian player of 2016.

In 2017 he joined Slovakian team MŠK Žilina.

MŠK Žilina
He made his professional Fortuna Liga debut for MŠK Žilina against FO ŽP Šport Podbrezová on 27 May 2017. Eligijus was given the number 29, when he arrived to the club. Jankauskas also played few matches for second MŠK Žilina team - MŠK Žilina B, which at the time played in 2. Liga and ended up in fourth position 2016-17 season.

International career
He made his debut for the Lithuania national football team on 2 September 2021 in a World Cup qualifier against the Northern Ireland, a 1–4 home loss. He substituted Fedor Černych in the 80th minute.

Honours

Club 
MŠK Žilina
 Fortuna Liga: 2016-17

FK Sūduva
 Super Cup winner: 2019

Individual 
 The most prospective player playing in Lithuania: 2016

References

External links
 MŠK Žilina official club profile
 
 Futbalnet profile

1998 births
Living people
Lithuanian footballers
Lithuania youth international footballers
Lithuania under-21 international footballers
Lithuania international footballers
Lithuanian expatriate footballers
Association football forwards
FC Šiauliai players
FK Utenis Utena players
FK Sūduva Marijampolė players
MŠK Žilina players
MFK Zemplín Michalovce players
Slovak Super Liga players
SFC Opava players
Expatriate footballers in Slovakia
Lithuanian expatriate sportspeople in Slovakia
Expatriate footballers in the Czech Republic
Lithuanian expatriate sportspeople in the Czech Republic
People from Šiauliai